Ljubomir Mladenovski (born May 2, 1995) is a Macedonian professional basketball center who currently plays for Pelister. He is also member of Macedonia national basketball team.

References

External links
 mztskopjeaerodrom.mk
 U-20 European Basketball championship 
 U-18 European Basketball championship

1995 births
Living people
ABA League players
Centers (basketball)
KK MZT Skopje players
KK Rabotnički players
Macedonian men's basketball players
Sportspeople from Skopje
KD Ilirija players